Halilović is a Bosniak surname. 
Notable people with the surname include:
 (b. 1996), Bosnian-Austrian football player
Alen Halilović (b. 1996), Croatian football player
 (b. 1993), Bosnian professional alpine skier
 (b. 1953), Bosnian writer
Denis Halilović (b. 1986), Slovenian football player
Dino Halilović (b. 1998), Croatian football player
Emir Halilović (b. 1989), Bosnian football player
 (b. 1977), Serbian songwriter, journalist and writer
Enver Halilović, former ambassador of Bosnia and Herzegovina to the Russian Federation
 (b. 1940, d. 1998), Bosnian mufti
 (b. 1946), Bosnian writer and journalist
Jasminko Halilović (b. 1988), Bosnian writer and entrepreneur
 (b. 1976), Bosnian turbo-folk singer
 (b. 1976), Bosnian diplomat
 (b. 1969), Bosnian politician
Miralem Halilović (b. 1991), Bosnian basketball player
Mirsad Halilović (b. 1983), German skeleton racer of Bosnian origin
Nedim Halilović (b. 1979), Bosnian international football player
Nedžis Halilović (b. 1979), Bosnian writer and columnist
 (b. 1965), Bosnian imam
Rusmir Halilović (b. 1948), Yugoslav basketball coach
 (b. 1986), Bosnian volleyball player
Safet Halilović (b. 1951, d. 2017), Bosniak politician
 (b. 1968), Bosnian theologian and writer
 aka Sanela Halilović (b. 1988), Bosnian singer-songwriter
Sefer Halilović (b. 1952), former general and commanding officer of the Army of the Republic of Bosnia and Herzegovina
Sejad Halilović (b. 1969), retired Bosnian professional footballer
Senahid Halilović (b. 1958), Bosnian linguist
Slobodan Halilović (b. 1951), Serbian football manager and former player
Sulejman Halilović (b. 1955), former footballer from Bosnia and Herzegovina
Tibor Halilović (b. 1995), Croatian football player

See also
Bosnian-Herzegovinian Patriotic Party-Sefer Halilović, Bosniak political party in Bosnia and Herzegovina
Halevi
Halovo
Alilović

Bosnian surnames